The Flying Luna Clipper is an 1987 Japanese computer-animated art film/demo directed by Ikko Ono and produced by Sony. The film was animated entirely using 8-bit MSX computers and was released on Video8, Betamax, VHS, and LaserDisc in Japan. It was mostly unknown until a copy was found in a Japanese thrift store and uploaded to YouTube in December 2015 by journalist Matt Hawkins.

Plot 
The film depicts a group of anthropomorphic fruits and other creatures who win a contest for a ticket on the first flight of a newly found Martin M-130 flying boat named the Flying Luna Clipper. Departing from Honolulu, they embark on a journey across the Pacific Ocean and watch short films on a 200-inch screen during the trip.

Background 
He also had his own column called Ikko's Gallery about using the computer as a tool for illustration. Many of the illustrations he created for the magazine depict characters seen the film. Later he had another column called Ikko's Theatre about short films which served as the basis for The Flying Luna Clipper. It was first announced in the May 1987 issue of the magazine to celebrate the fifth anniversary of the publication, and according to the same magazine, was released via home video on 1 October of that year, and was featured again in Ikko's Theatre the following month.

Legacy 
A revived run of MSX Magazine was published between 2002 and 2005. A special limited edition of the magazine published a series of 12 artworks in December 2003 by Ohno featuring characters from the film entitled "The Flying Luna Clipper 2004", followed by a calendar featuring the art for that year. However, a sequel was never created. The film remained obscure until December 2015 when a LaserDisc copy was uploaded online by Matt Hawkins, after which it steadily grew in popularity.

See also 

 Machinima

References

External links 

 Full film on YouTube
 
 Dream Flight Interpreted: The Deconstructed Flying Luna Clipper by Matt Hawkins
 Review: The Flying Luna Clipper, Part 1 and Part 2 by Matt Hawkins
 Review on Apocalypse Later by Hal C. F. Astell
 Review on 1000 Anime by Michael Hewis

Japanese computer-animated films
1987 anime films
1987 computer-animated films
Films set in Oceania
MSX